Miron Babiak, (January 31, 1932 in Sanok, Poland – September 25, 2013 in Gdynia, Poland), was a Polish sea captain, who is best known for commanding Prof. Siedlecki Antarctica research ship.

Early career 

Miron Babiak is an alumnus of Szkoła Rybołóstwa Morskiego in Gdynia. From 1951 onwards he was a first officer on ships belonging to Dalmor. In 1959 he became a captain, then four years later gained Marine Master diploma.

In 1968 he established a daily fishing record of Gen. Rachimów on the seas of Labrador, a remarkable example of his marine talent and passion.

Antarctica expedition on Profesor Siedlecki 

In 1975 research vessel Profesor Siedlecki took its second cruise, commanded by captain Miron Babiak to explore the fishing grounds of Kerguelen Island.

The success of this journey led to further three expeditions of Profesor Siedlecki.

Gdańszczanin Roku ("Man of the Gdańsk" prize) 

In 1977 he was chosen "Gdańszczanin Roku" a prestige prize for his achievements.

References 

Polish sailors
2013 deaths
People from Sanok County
1932 births
Gdynia Maritime University alumni